Breezewood is an unincorporated town in East Providence Township, Bedford County in south-central Pennsylvania, United States.

Along a traditional pathway for Native Americans, European settlers, and British troops during colonial times, in the early 20th century, the small valley that became known as Breezewood was a popular stopping place for automobile travelers on the Lincoln Highway, beginning in 1913. Greyhound Lines opened a Post House facility in the town in 1935; it closed in 2004.

In 1940, Breezewood was designated exit 6 on the just-opened Pennsylvania Turnpike. In the 1960s, Breezewood became the junction of the Turnpike and the new Interstate 70. Later renumbered exit 12, it is now exit 161 on the Turnpike following a change to mileage-based exit numbering.

Breezewood has been labeled a "tourist trap" and choke point because traffic between I-70 and the Turnpike is routed along surface streets lined with gas stations, hotels, restaurants, and traffic lights, rather than directly via a freeway-to-freeway junction. This segment of I-70 is one of the few parts of the Interstate Highway System which is not a controlled-access highway.

History 
The community which became known as Breezewood has a long history of serving cross-country travelers.

Early history 
Before the Europeans arrived, an old trail of the Native Americans crossed through there. Later, in colonial times before the American Revolutionary War (1776–1781) and the Conestoga wagons of the westbound settlers, a wagon road passed through.  A British military trail was built in 1758 by General John Forbes from Chambersburg to Pittsburgh during the French and Indian War. It was later known as the Pittsburgh Road and the Conestoga Road. Through the tiny valley was built the Chambersburg-Bedford Turnpike, a private toll road which came later.

South Pennsylvania Railroad 
Late in the 19th century, leaders of the New York Central Railroad (NYC) dreamed of building an east–west railroad across southern Pennsylvania through the Breezewood area to compete with the Pennsylvania Railroad (PRR). Over $10 million was spent and 26 lives lost when work on William H. Vanderbilt's planned South Pennsylvania Railroad project was halted in 1886. Control shifted to financier J.P. Morgan and PRR interests. The potentially competing South Pennsylvania Railroad was promptly abandoned and never completed, although much grading and tunneling work had been done.

Developing the community 
A community called Rays Hill (or Nycumtown) was located just east of present-day Breezewood where a man named John Nycum had a small store. In 1836, he succeeded in establishing the Rays Hill Post Office and he served as the first Postmaster. The Rays Hill Post Office was the smallest in the country, at six feet by eight feet. On the western edge of Breezewood (or known as White Hall in the early 1800s), stands the Federal style mansion known as the Maple Lawn Inn (originally called Martin's Tavern), which opened around 1789. The 22-room building boasts 11 fireplaces, patriotic/masonic medallions, and was used as a stage coach stop and underground railroad safehouse, with a foundation several feet thick, and walls 3 to 4 bricks thick. It has been nominated to the National Register of Historic Places.

With the advent of the automobile, by the early 20th century, the area in a small valley between Rays Hill and the Maple Lawn Inn had become known locally as Breezewood. The name was applied to a repair garage built in 1937.

1913: Lincoln Highway, U.S. Route 30 
On July 1, 1913, American automotive pioneer Carl G. Fisher and other automobile enthusiasts and industry officials announced plans for the Lincoln Highway, the first transcontinental paved roadway in the United States to be created specifically for motorists. Former U.S. President Theodore Roosevelt and Thomas A. Edison, both friends of Fisher, sent checks, as well as then-current President Woodrow Wilson, who has been noted as the first U.S. president to make frequent use of an automobile for what was described as stress-relief relaxation rides.

In 1919, around the end of World War I, the U.S. Army undertook its first Transcontinental Motor Convoy. It followed the Lincoln Highway from Gettysburg, Pennsylvania, to San Francisco, California, passing through Breezewood. The trip demonstrated the potential military importance of such a roadway, as well as the need for consistency in both improvements and maintenance. One of the young Army officers was Dwight David Eisenhower, then a Lt. Colonel. The convoy was memorable enough for him to include a chapter on the trip entitled "Through Darkest America With Truck and Tank," in At Ease: Stories I Tell to Friends (Doubleday and Company, Inc., 1967). During World War II, then-General Eisenhower was also deeply impressed with the German autobahn roadway network. Those experiences combined to convince him the need to support construction of the Interstate Highway System when he became President of the United States in 1953. The portion of the Lincoln Highway from Philadelphia to Pittsburgh received the transcontinental U.S. Route 30 designation, which it still bears.

1940: Pennsylvania Turnpike 
When the Pennsylvania Turnpike was built in the 1930s, the tiny eastern Bedford County locality made sure it would be served by the new highway. Breezewood is at the original exit 6 of the Turnpike, which opened on October 1, 1940. The new turnpike used much of the earlier South Pennsylvania Railroad project for its right-of-way, grading, and tunnels.

Breezewood, with a faded sign proclaiming it the "Town of Motels" and the "Traveler's Oasis", boomed after the Pennsylvania Turnpike opened, with one gas station and the first traveler's stop, the Gateway Motel and Restaurant. Gateway remains open as of early 2022 as a truck stop affiliated with T/A, competing with other gas stations, hotels, restaurants, and a Flying J franchise.

1960s: Connecting the Turnpike with the new I-70 
Over 25 years later, when Interstate 70 was built through Pennsylvania, it was co-signed with the Pennsylvania Turnpike for 86 miles, between Breezewood and New Stanton. The I-70 section of the Turnpike included tunnels under the eastern continental divide of the Allegheny Mountains and Laurel Hill, crossing some of Pennsylvania's most rugged terrain. The Laurel Hill Tunnel was later abandoned.

About the same time as I-70 was built, in the early and mid-1960s, a major group of improvements was made to the original turnpike. These included roadway capacity improvement along the portion shared with I-70 at the two major mountains, where traffic had been reduced to two lanes in tunnels, and a realignment of the Breezewood exit and the turnpike to the east from there.

Unusual I-70 alignment 

I-70 uses a surface road (part of US 30) with at-grade intersections to connect the freeway heading south to Hancock, Maryland, with the ramp to I-76, which through this section is the Pennsylvania Turnpike toll road. According to the Federal Highway Administration, the peculiar arrangement at Breezewood resulted because at the time I-70's toll-free segment was built, the state did not qualify for federal funds under the Federal Aid Highway Act of 1956 to build a direct interchange, unless it agreed to cease collecting tolls on the Turnpike once the construction bonds were retired—a direct interchange would have meant that a westbound driver on I-70 could not choose between the toll route and a free alternative, but would be forced to enter the Turnpike. However, the Pennsylvania Turnpike Commission was not willing to build the interchange with its own funds, due to the expected decrease in revenue once Interstate 80 was completed through the state. Accordingly, the state chose to build the unusual Breezewood arrangement in lieu of a direct interchange, thus qualifying for federal funds because this arrangement gave drivers the option of continuing on the untolled US 30.

Although laws have been relaxed since then, local businesses, including many traveler services like fast food restaurants, gas stations and motels, have lobbied to keep the gap and not directly connect I-70 to the Turnpike, fearing a loss of business. In order for a bypass to be considered, Breezewood's own Bedford County must propose it, which is "just not an issue that really appears on the radar for us," Donald Schwartz, the Bedford County planning director, said in 2017.

The short stretch of I-70 through Breezewood is one of only two locations in the U.S. where there are traffic lights on a two-digit Interstate Highway (the other being Interstate 78 in Jersey City, New Jersey, at the west portal to the Holland Tunnel). Former Pennsylvania State Senate President Pro Tempore Robert Jubelirer was not in favor of building a direct interchange between the two interstates.

Despite this abnormality, this is not the only area where the Turnpike has had an indirect interchange with an Interstate highway due to this funding glitch, although it is the only one where an Interstate highway has had to run onto a surface street. Interstate 79 in Cranberry Township; Interstate 81 near Carlisle; and Interstate 95 in Bristol Township have had, for decades, no direct connection to the mainline Turnpike, with I-79 relying on U.S. Route 19 to get onto the Turnpike and vice versa, while I-81 has had to rely on U.S. Route 11 for Turnpike access and vice versa, and I-95 had no access to the Turnpike at all. (Interstate 99, which relies on U.S. Route 220 for Turnpike access near Bedford, was only commissioned in 1998.) While direct access between I-79 and the Turnpike was constructed in 2003 and another interchange to connect I-95 with the Turnpike opened in 2018, the indirect access in Carlisle remains.

2000s: Pike 2 Bike 
The Pennsylvania Turnpike sold most of a 13-mile (21 km) abandoned stretch to the Southern Alleghenies Conservancy (SAC) for $1 in 2001. The property is managed by Friends of the Pike 2 Bike, a coalition converting the stretch from Breezewood eastward into a bike trail. There are two tunnels located on Pike 2 Bike's trail, the Rays Hill Tunnel, and the Sideling Hill Tunnel. Both tunnels were left abandoned after that stretch of the turnpike closed.

Tourist services and amenities 
Approximately 2.6 million vehicles exited the turnpike through Breezewood in 1995. By 2003, that figure had increased to 3.4 million. During high traffic periods, the arrangement can result in extended traffic jams on all three highways.

There are a number of gasoline and diesel fuel choices, including several equipped to handle trucks and buses. Within the several-block area, a wide variety of family-style restaurants and fast-food outlets are available. Breezewood continues to meet its claim of "Town of Motels"; through the years, it has offered many hundreds of hotel and motel rooms.

According to a 1990 article in The New York Times, Breezewood offered "no less than 10 motels, 14 fast-food restaurants and 7 fuel and service stations, including two sprawling truck stops." Approximately 1,000 people are employed in Breezewood's commercial district.

Business Week stated in 1991 that Breezewood is "perhaps the purest example yet devised of the great American tourist trap...the Las Vegas of roadside strips, a blaze of neon in the middle of nowhere, a polyp on the nation's interstate highway system."

Community 
The Breezewood community is not incorporated under Pennsylvania law and is treated as a portion of East Providence Township, Bedford County, Pennsylvania. Commerce in Breezewood is about 75 percent of East Providence Township's tax base.

Although it is not being tracked by the Census Bureau, the settlement has been assigned the ZIP code of 15533.

There are few residences in the immediate area of Breezewood.

Geography 

Breezewood is situated in the Ridge and Valley Physiographic Province of the Appalachian Mountains of Pennsylvania.  It lies on the western edge of Rays Hill.

See also 
 List of gaps on Interstate Highways
 South of the Border (attraction) in South Carolina
 Wall Drug in South Dakota

References

Further reading 
 
 2017 New York Times article about the I-70 loop. Charlie Savage. 2017 Feb 6.
 Washington Post article. "The Town That Stops Traffic." Manuel Roig-Franzia. Nov 22, 2001.
 1999 Wall Street Journal article. Bruce Ingersoll. 1999 Jul 26.

External links 
 Photos of Eastbound I-70 at Breezewood, including traffic lights —   from 

Breezewood
Unincorporated communities in Pennsylvania